Cause and effect is the principle of causality, establishing one event or action as the direct result of another.

Cause and effect may also refer to:

Cause and effect, a central concept of Buddhism; see Karma in Buddhism
Cause and effect, the statistical concept and test, see Granger causality
Cause and effect, the graphical method in quality control engineering, see Ishikawa diagram

TV 
 "Cause and Effect" (Star Trek: The Next Generation), a 1992 fifth-season episode of Star Trek: The Next Generation
 "Cause and Effect" (Numbers), the season finale of the sixth season of the American television show Numbers
 "Cause and Effect" (Robin Hood), the second episode of the third series of the BBC's drama Robin Hood
 "Cause and Effect" (The Flash), an episode of The Flash

Music 
 Cause and Effect (band), an American electronica/synthpop band
Cause & Effect, a 1990 album by Cause and Effect
 Cause and Effect (Digital Summer album), a 2007 album by Digital Summer
 Cause and Effect (Maria Mena album), a 2008 album by Maria Mena
 Cause and Effect (Keane album), a 2019 album by Keane
 Cause and Effect, a 2002 album by Human Drama